The American Baking Competition is a reality competition television series that aired on CBS from May 29  to July 10, 2013. It was an adaptation of The Great British Bake Off (which aired in the United States under the title The Great British Baking Show). The series aimed to find the best amateur baker in the United States. The series was hosted by Jeff Foxworthy and judged by Marcela Valladolid and Paul Hollywood.  The competition was won by Brian Emmett.

Format

The show aimed to find among its contestants the best amateur baker in the US.  Ten contestants were chosen for the first season.  In each episode, the amateur bakers were given three challenges: a signature, a technical challenge, and a show-stopper.  The three challenges took place over two days, and the dishes made by the contestants were assessed by the judges after each challenge.  At the end of the three challenges, the judges chose a Star Baker for the week, and a contestant was also eliminated.  In the finale three bakers were left and a winner was chosen from the three.

 Signature – a dish using their own tried and tested recipe that the amateur bakers make for their family and friends.
 Technical - a dessert using the same ingredients and recipe provided by the judges.  The recipe given however has missing instructions and is designed to test the knowledge and skill of the bakers.  The bakers are not told beforehand what the challenge might be, and the judges do not observe the bakers at work and judge the resulting dish without knowing who made them. This round is the only one where how each contestant performed is directly revealed. The contestants are given a ranking, but that ranking is not their total score for the episode.
 Show-stopper - a recipe designed to impress the judges.

The competition was held in one location in a specially constructed marquee.  Interspersed in the show were short videos on the background of the contestants, as well as information on the history of baking and visiting various locations.

The entire season series was shot over a one-month period.

The winner of the competition received a $250,000 grand prize and a publishing contract with Simon & Schuster.

Production
On October 17, 2012, CBS ordered the series under the original title Bake-Off. Since Pillsbury Company held the trademark to the name (using it for its Pillsbury Bake-Off), the show was later renamed The American Baking Competition.

CBS placed casting calls for participants on November 14, 2012. Auditions were held between December 1 and December 15, 2012.  The competition took place at the Gibbs Gardens in Ball Ground, Georgia in March 2013.

Broadcast
The first season of The American Baking Competition premiered on May 29, 2013. It aired four episodes in the Wednesdays at 8 p.m. Eastern/9 p.m. Central timeslot. On June 26, 2013, it moved to 9 p.m. Eastern/8 p.m. Central, to make way for Big Brother, and aired its three remaining episodes in that timeslot. Both of these timeslots put the series opposite Fox's MasterChef.

In 2015, ABC premiered a second U.S. version of the format, The Great Holiday Baking Show. The Christmas-themed revival ran for four episodes as part of ABC's December lineup, and featured Johnny Iuzzini joined by British judge Mary Berry. The series returned for a second season in 2016, renamed The Great American Baking Show.

Bakers

Results summary

Color Key:

Episodes

Episode 1: "Pies & Tarts"
Episode one aired on May 29, 2013. The theme of the episode was sweet and savory pies and tarts.

For the signature bake, the bakers were given two hours to bake an American pie.  On the technical bake, the bakers were required to bake a free-standing savory pie using Paul Hollywood's own recipe.  The pie would be a hot water crust pastry and the bakers were given two hours.  For the showstopper, the bakers needed to make 36 sweet tartlets within three hours.

Color key:

Episode 2: "Cookies"
Episode two aired on June 5, 2013. The theme of the episode was all kinds of cookies.

The bakers were set the challenge of baking 12 cookies in an hour and a half using their own recipe, and all the cookies baked should be presented to the judges.  For the technical challenge, the bakers were required to make in two hours 18 S'mores using Marcela's recipe.  For the final showstopper, the bakers were given four hours to bake 40 sandwich Macarons.  They must be of two different types, have a delicate crisp shell and soft chewy center.

Episode 3: "Cakes"
Episode three aired on June 12, 2013. The theme of the episode was cake.

The bakers were set to make a One-Layer Cake in 90 minutes in the signature bake.  In the technical challenge, they were given two hours and fifteen minutes to bake a Chiffon Cake with Tequila Orange Glaze using Marcela's recipe.  For the showstopper, the challenge was to make a Surprise Inside Cake where, when sliced open, a surprise design is revealed.  The bakers were given five hours for the challenge.

Episode 4: "Breads"
Episode four aired on June 19, 2013. The theme of the episode was bread and pastries.

For the signature bake, the bakers had three hours to make a free-form loaf of bread.  The bread had to be yeast bread, and hand shaped. In the technical bake, the bakers were given one hour and 45 minutes to make eight large soft pretzels using Paul's recipe.  Immediately following the technical challenge, the bakers went on to make the showstopper, which was two types of croissants, one plain and one filled. They were given two hours the first day, allowed the dough to rise overnight in the fridge, and then three hours the next day to finish the bake.

Episode 5: "Desserts"
Episode five aired on June 26, 2013. The theme of the episode was sweet baked goods.

For the signature bake, the bakers must make 8 individual custards, either sweet like a crème brûlée, or using a more savory recipe.  They had 90 minutes to finish the task.   In the technical bake, the challenge was to bake a chocolate soufflé, however.  As the soufflé can fall within minutes of coming out of the oven, the start time for the bakers was staggered so that each bake can be judged immediately after it was baked.  The bakers were each given an hour and 45 minutes.    For the final challenge, the bakers were required to produce a layered dessert featuring meringue in five hours.

Episode 6: "Patisserie"
Episode six aired on July 3, 2013. It was the semi-finals of the competition. The theme of the episode was French pastries, often called patisserie.

The tarte tatin was the signature bake. The contestants were required to complete it in two hours and fifteen minutes.  For the technical bake, the bakers were required to make 4 Napoleons, using Paul Hollywood's own recipe, in two and a half hours.  For the showstopper, the contestants had to make a choux tower in four and a half hours.

Episode 7: "Finale"
Episode seven aired on July 10, 2013. It was the finals of the competition. The theme was patriotism, with dishes that were all related to the United States.

The contestants could make anything for the signature bake but had to include the official state crop of Georgia, the peanut; they had a time limit of two hours thirty minutes. The contestants had two hours forty-five minutes to complete a Paul Hollywood recipe; a dozen Boston Cream Donuts. For the showstopper the final three contestants had five hours to make 72 miniature desserts inspired by the American flag; 24 mini-meringues, 24 mini-tarts and 24 mini-cakes.

Reception

Critical reception
The American Baking Competition has received mixed reviews from critics.

Liane Bonin Starr of HitFix stated that the series was "surprisingly nice" for a reality TV series. She felt that it was very mellow, so "it was up to judges Marcela Valladolid and Paul Hollywood to provide some acid to the recipe." She did appreciate the series's showcasing of the food, saying "what the show lacks in intensity it makes up for in food."

TV Lines Michael Slezak described the series as "half-baked" stating that there was "not really enough time to focus on getting to know the players" or to get "a real insight into their baking philosophies." Additionally, the pilot's outcome was described as "as predictable as the use of butter in a pie crust." He expressed hope that "future installments might take a few tips from various Food Network competition shows and put a little more emphasis on the actual dishes."

Ratings
The series premiered to a disappointing 1.0 rating in the Adults 18-49 demographic and 5.11 million total viewers. This made it the worst ever Wednesday premiere for a CBS show. However, it rose in ratings for the first two weeks, a feat ratings experts called "extremely rare." It had seemed like the series would be boosted by moving behind Big Brother on June 26, but it didn't end up that way, as the ratings were generally the same after the move. The last two episodes did not help the series, as it went down slightly, a movement that was not good for the series's renewal prospects. The show was cancelled in July 2013.

References

External links
 
 
 The American Baking Competition at TV by the Numbers

2010s American cooking television series
2013 American television series debuts
2013 American television series endings
2010s American game shows
2010s American reality television series
American television series based on British television series
CBS original programming
Cooking competitions in the United States
English-language television shows
US
Food reality television series